Anopinella consecta is a species of moth of the family Tortricidae. It is found in Ecuador.

References 

Anopinella
Moths described in 2003
Moths of South America
Taxa named by Józef Razowski